The  Edmonton Elks season was the 63rd season for the team in the Canadian Football League and their 72nd overall. This was the first season that the team competed under a new name, as the "Eskimos" moniker was retired in 2020, and the new name "Elks" was announced on June 1, 2021.

The team failed to qualify for the playoffs for the first time since 2018 following a week 14 loss to the Saskatchewan Roughriders on November 5, 2021. The team also finished the season without a home win for the first time in the team's 72–year history following that same home loss to the Roughriders.

This was the fourth season under general manager Brock Sunderland. This would have been the first season under head coach Scott Milanovich, but he resigned from his position on January 25, 2021. Instead, Jaime Elizondo was named as the 23rd head coach in the team's history on February 1, 2021.

An 18-game season schedule was originally released on November 20, 2020, but it was announced on April 21, 2021 that the start of the season would likely be delayed until August and feature a 14-game schedule. On June 15, 2021, the league released the revised 14-game schedule with regular season play beginning on August 5, 2021.

Offseason

CFL Global Draft
The 2021 CFL Global Draft took place on April 15, 2021. With the format being a snake draft, Edmonton selected second in the odd-numbered rounds and eighth in the even-numbered rounds.

CFL National Draft
The 2021 CFL Draft took place on May 4, 2021. The team had six selections in the six-round snake draft and had the fifth pick in each of the rounds.

Preseason
Due to the shortening of the season, the CFL confirmed that pre-season games would not be played in 2021.

Planned schedule

Regular season

Season standings

Season schedule
The Elks initially had a schedule that featured 18 regular season games beginning on June 12 and ending on October 30. However, due to the COVID-19 pandemic in Canada, the Canadian Football League delayed the start of the regular season to August 5, 2021 and the Elks began their 14-game season on August 7, 2021.

On August 22, 2021, it was announced that the Elks had several players test positive for COVID-19, so the August 26, 2021 game was postponed with the re-scheduled date to be declared once the Elks pass health and safety protocols. The CFL announced on September 2, 2021 that the game was re-scheduled for Tuesday, November 16, 2021, meaning that the Elks will play three games in just a seven-day span.

Team

Roster

Coaching staff

References

External links
 

Edmonton Elks seasons
2021 Canadian Football League season by team
2021 in Alberta